The Art of More is an American series which debuted on November 19, 2015, on Crackle.

On December 2, 2015, Crackle renewed the series for a second season which consists of 10 episodes. Filming for season two began in early 2016, and was released on November 16, 2016.

Premise
The series explores the underbelly and surprisingly cutthroat high-stakes world of New York auction houses.

Cast and characters
 Christian Cooke as Thomas Graham Connor
 Kate Bosworth as Roxanna Whitman
 Cary Elwes as Arthur Davenport
 Dennis Quaid as Samuel Brukner
 Joe Cobden as Todd Fletcher

Episodes

Series overview

Season 1 (2015)

Season 2 (2016)

References

External links

2010s American drama television series
2015 American television series debuts
2016 American television series endings
English-language television shows
Crackle (streaming service) original programming
Television series by Sony Pictures Television
Television shows set in New York City